Eastbourne District General Hospital is a National Health Service hospital in Eastbourne in East Sussex, England. It is managed by the East Sussex Healthcare NHS Trust.

History
The hospital, which was built in the mid-1970s, was officially opened by Princess Alexandra in 1977. It was expanded in 1989 under a scheme which allowed the old Victorian St Mary's Hospital to close and be demolished in 1990. In 2015 the hospital confirmed that it had sent off a sample, taken from a patient with a history of travel in West Africa, for precautionary ebola testing at Public Health England.

See also
 Healthcare in Sussex
 List of hospitals in England

References

External links
Official site

NHS hospitals in England